Christian Cornelius McCain (born November 21, 1991) is a mixed martial artist and an American football defensive end who is currently a free agent. He played college football at California. He was signed by the Miami Dolphins as an undrafted free agent in 2014.

Professional career

Miami Dolphins
McCain was signed by the Miami Dolphins after going undrafted in the 2014 NFL Draft.

Due to a knee injury, he was placed on the team's injured reserve on December 22, 2015.

New Orleans Saints
The Dolphins traded McCain to the New Orleans Saints for a conditional seventh round draft pick on August 29, 2016. On September 3, 2016, he was released by the Saints.

Dallas Cowboys
On September 7, 2016, McCain was signed to the Cowboys' practice squad. He was released on September 28.

Second stint with Saints
On October 13, the New Orleans Saints signed McCain to their practice squad. On October 22, McCain was promoted to the Saints active roster before their Week 7 game against the Kansas City Chiefs. He was released on October 25, 2016 and re-signed to the practice squad two days later. He was promoted back to the active roster on November 5, 2016, however was released two days later.

San Diego / Los Angeles Chargers
On November 23, 2016, McCain was signed to the Chargers' practice squad. He signed a reserve/future contract with the Chargers on January 3, 2017.

McCain made the Chargers final roster in 2017, playing in 15 games and finished third on the team with five sacks behind Joey Bosa and Melvin Ingram.

On March 14, 2018, set to be a restricted free agent, McCain received a right of first refusal tender by the Chargers. However, on April 15, 2018, the Chargers rescinded the tender on McCain, making him an unrestricted free agent.

Indianapolis Colts
On May 8, 2018, McCain signed with the Indianapolis Colts. He was placed on injured reserve on September 1, 2018. He was released on September 11, 2018.

Columbus Destroyers
On April 3, 2019, McCain was assigned to the Columbus Destroyers. He was placed on recallable reassignment on April 19, 2019.

Mixed martial arts career

Background and amateur career
McCain had been training mixed martial arts during the offseasons for the sake of conditioning but after his NFL career abruptly ended, he needed somewhere to go. He reached out to fellow NFL veteran Shawne Merriman – who had been trying to lure him to MMA for the previous couple of years – and subsequently signed a contract with Merriman's Lights Out Xtreme Fighting promotion. McCain immediately moved to California and begun training seriously at BodyShop MMA under Antonio McKee, making his amateur debut on July 6, 2019.

As of early 2020, McCain is 3–0 in amateur competition.

|-
|Win
|align=center|3–0
|Anthony Taufi
|Submission (guillotine choke)
|Lights Out Xtreme Fighting 4
|
|align=center|2
|align=center|2:47
|Burbank, California, United States
|
|-
|Win
|align=center|2–0
|Matheus Moraes
|Decision (unanimous)
|Lights Out Xtreme Fighting 3
|
|align=center|3
|align=center|3:00
|Commerce, California, United States
|
|-
|Win
|align=center|1–0
|Jamal Harris
|TKO (punches)
|Lights Out Xtreme Fighting 2
|
|align=center|2
|align=center|0:38
|Burbank, California, United States
|

Personal life
McCain has a daughter and a son from his previous relationships.

References

External links
Miami Dolphins bio
California Golden Bears bio

1991 births
Living people
Players of American football from Greensboro, North Carolina
American football linebackers
American football defensive ends
California Golden Bears football players
Miami Dolphins players
New Orleans Saints players
Dallas Cowboys players
San Diego Chargers players
Los Angeles Chargers players
Indianapolis Colts players
Columbus Destroyers players